Agha Zahid (Urdu: آغا زاہد) (born 7 January 1953) is a former Pakistani cricketer who played in one test against West Indies in 1975. He had a long and distinguished domestic first-class career scoring over 13,000 runs in 227 matches. He played for Devon County Cricket Club and Barton Cricket Club from 1982 to 1986. He also won promotion in first attempt followed by two consecutive first division championship in 1983–84.

After retiring from playing, Zahid worked as the Chief Curator for Pakistan Cricket Board (PCB), retiring from that role in 2020. Throughout his career, he has also coached Pakistan national under-19 cricket team, and Pakistan women's national cricket team. He coached U-15 in Lambord World Cup England in 1996 and also coached Pakistan U-19 against Australia home in 1997. He toured to Bangladesh as Coach Pakistan A to win SAARC Championship in 1997. Later on toured England with Pakistan A team. He had also officiated as a domestic match referee from 1995–2000. He worked as chairman of Junior selection committee 1999–2000. 

Agha Zahid lives with his family, he has three daughters and a wife.

References

External links
 Agha Zahid at ESPN Cricinfo

1953 births
Living people
Pakistani cricketers
Pakistan Test cricketers
Habib Bank Limited cricketers
Devon cricketers
Cricketers from Lahore
Lahore Blues cricketers
Lahore A cricketers
Pakistan Universities cricketers
Punjab University cricketers
Punjab A cricketers
Punjab (Pakistan) cricketers